Berglund is a surname of Swedish origin. It means 'mountain grove' (berg means 'mountain' or 'hill', and lund means 'grove of trees', derived from the Old Norse lundr).

Geographical distribution
As of 2014, 64.1% of all known bearers of the surname Berglund were residents of Sweden, 23.8% of the United States, 4.8% of Norway, 2.5% of Finland and 1.6% of Canada.

In Sweden, the frequency of the surname was higher than national average in the following counties:
 1. Västernorrland (1:150)
 2. Norrbotten (1:191)
 3. Västerbotten (1:216)
 4. Gävleborg (1:260)
 5. Dalarna (1:271)
 6. Jämtland (1:291)
 7. Värmland (1:380)
 8. Västmanland (1:408)
 9. Uppsala (1:438)
 10. Södermanland (1:451)

People
In sports:
 Anna-Lisa Berglund (born ?), Swedish archer
 Art Berglund (born 1940), retired Canadian-American ice hockey player
 Bo Berglund (born 1955), retired Swedish professional ice hockey player
 Bruno Berglund, Swedish rally car racer
 Charles Berglund (born 1965), retired Swedish professional ice hockey player
 Christian Berglund (born 1980), Swedish professional ice hockey player
 Claes Berglund, Swedish ski orienteerer
 Elina Berglund (born 1984), particle physicist and entrepreneur
 Eva Berglund (born 1984), Swedish swimmer
 Fredrik Berglund (born 1979), Swedish professional football (soccer) player
 Hans Berglund (1918–2006), Swedish sprint canoer
 Johan Berglund (born 1983), Swedish bandy player
 Kalle Berglund, Swedish athlete
 Marianne Berglund (born 1963), Swedish cyclist
 Maud Berglund (1934–2000), Swedish swimmer
 Oscar Berglund (born 1984), Swedish football (soccer) goaltender
 Patrik Berglund (born 1988), Swedish ice hockey player
 Per-Arne Berglund (1927–2002), Swedish javelin thrower, silver at the 1950 European Championships
 Tomas Berglund (born ?), Swedish ice hockey player

In music:
 Dan Berglund (born 1963), Swedish jazz contrabassist
 Eric Berglund (born 1981), Swedish musician in the band The Tough Alliance
 Anders Berglund (born 1948), Swedish composer, arranger, musician, and conductor
 Bernhard Berglund (1891–1944), Swedish teacher and composer
 Dan Berglund (born 1954), Finnish-Swedish singer
 Michael Berglund (born 1978) American music producer and studio engineer under pseudonym "Zebulon Dak"
 Joel Berglund (1903–1985), Swedish opera singer
 Lily Berglund (1928–2010), Swedish singer and actress
 Olle Berglund (1908–1998), Swedish hymn writer
 Paavo Berglund (1929–2012), Finnish conductor
 Ruth Berglund (1897–1984), Swedish opera singer

In film and television:
 Bertil Berglund (1898–1979), Swedish actor
 Björn Berglund (actor) (1904–1968), Swedish actor and singer
 Elsa Berglund (née Wickman, 1885–1967), Swedish actress, married actor Erik Berglund in 1912
 Erik "Bullen" Berglund (1887–1963), Swedish actor and director
 Ernst Berglund (1888–1971), Swedish actor
 Harald Berglund (1904–1980), Swedish cinematographer
 Kelli Berglund (born 1996), American actress
 Pär Brundin (born 1972 as Pär Berglund), Swedish director and actor
 Pelle Berglund (born 1939), Swedish director, producer, and screenwriter
 Svenn Berglund (born 1939), Norwegian dancer and actor
 Timothy Björklund (born ?), American director, sometimes credited as Timothy Berglund
Anna Sophia Berglund (born 1986), American actress and model

In politics:
 Alfred Berglund (Minnesota politician) (1871-1962), American farmer and politician
 Carl Berglund (1859–1921), Swedish politician
 Elmer E. Berglund (1924-2008), American politician
 Helge Berglund (1907–?), Swedish politician
 Jan Berglund (1864–?), Swedish politician
 Matteus Berglund (1898–1981), Swedish politician
 Mona Berglund Nilsson (born 1942), Swedish politician
 Rune Berglund (born 1939), Swedish politician

In literature and journalism:
 Anne-Marie Berglund (born 1952), Finnish-Swedish author
 Björn Berglund (author) (born 1938), Swedish author
 Christer Berglund (born 1950), Swedish journalist
 Fredrik Falk (born 1950 as Fredrik Berglund), Swedish journalist, author, and copywriter
 Jan-Erik Berglund (born 1957), Finnish journalist and actor
 Karin Berglund (born 1937), Swedish journalist, author, and photographer
 Lars Berglund (born 1921), Swedish author, screenwriter, and playwright

In fiction:
 The Berglund family, protagonists of Jonathan Franzen's novel Freedom

In other fields:
 Alfred Berglund (admiral) (1862-1945), Norwegian admiral
 Erik Berglund (furniture) (born 1921), Swedish furniture maker
 Nils Berglund (born 1923), Swedish illustrator and graphic artist
 Sten Berglund (born 1947), Swedish political scientist
 Thomas Berglund (born 1972), Swedish poker player
 Curtis Berglund (born 1981), American (of Swedish descent) lawyer, philosopher and thinker

References 

Swedish-language surnames